Zin Wine (also spelt Zin Wyne; born , Htay Lwin) is a Burmese film actor. He won the Myanmar Motion Picture Academy Awards two times and served as the chairperson of the Myanmar Motion Picture Organization twice as well.

Career
Zin Wine entered the film industry in 1973, when he was fourteen. He made his feature film debut in the 1981 film, Thanyawzin Sodar Shidae, along with Moh Moh Myint Aung. He experienced a rise in popularity after starring as Thet Htwe in the 1984 film, Thingyan Moe, directed by Maung Tin Oo under whom Zin Wine had learned cinematography for seven years. He took his first male lead role in the 1991 film, Dandaryi, alongside May Than Nu. Zin Wine won his first academy award in the 1997 film, Noble Heart.

After the Myanmar Motion Picture Organization was established as a non-government organization, Zin Wine was elected as its chairperson in April 2012 but resigned for his health condition in 2014, before his term was due. He  re-contested and was elected as the chairperson of the organization on 26 September 2017. On 30 December 2012, because of his efforts, the Myanmar Motion Picture Academy Awards presentation ceremony for 2011 could be held again in Yangon, after four years in the new capital Naypyidaw. In 2012, he became a member of Aung San Film Executive Board, together with Min Htin Ko Ko Gyi, Wyne, Htun Eaindra Bo, Ei Ei Khaing, Zarganar and Lu Min, formed by Aung San Suu Kyi, daughter of the protagonist Aung San.

Zin Wine anticipated in the 2014 film, Made in Heart, with Pyay Ti Oo, Moe Hay Ko and Wutt Hmone Shwe Yi, and won his second academy award in the category of Best Supporting Actor.

In the aftermath of the 2021 Myanmar coup d'état, on 15 April, Zin Wine was arrested under the section 505 (a) of the Myanmar Penal Code for encouraging civil servants to join ongoing civil disobedience movement, along with several other celebrities, while his son Min Maw Kun was issued an arrest warrant. He was released on 7 June but arrested again in a few months.

Personal life
Zin Wine, the fourth of five siblings, was born to retired lieutenant commander Sein Lwin and Yi Yi Shein. He married Khin Nwe Nwe Tun, and the couple had two sons, namely, Kyi Thar Htay Lwin and Kyaw Kyaw Htay Lwin. The latter is better known by his stage name Min Maw Kun.

Filmography

Film 
Among the 165 films Zin Wine has appeared, popular ones include: 
 Than Yaw Zin Shi Dal (သံယောဇဉ်ရှိတယ်) (1981)
 Thingyan Moe (သင်္ကြန်မိုး) (1985)
Myint Myat Nha Lone Thar(မြင့်မြတ်နှလုံးသား) 1997
Htar Waya A Linn Tan Myar (ထာဝရအလင်းတန်းများ) 2011

Awards and nominations

References

External links

Burmese male film actors
Living people
People from Yangon
1959 births
20th-century Burmese male actors